The Metropolitan Anarchist Coordinating Council (MACC) is an anarchist group based in New York City. Its principles, in accordance with anarchist values, include anti-oppression, direct action, direct democracy, horizontalism, and mutual aid.

The group was active in the city's 2020 Black Lives Matter protests. Its jail and court support group assisted arrested protesters by finding and appearing at arraignments, providing food and emotional support as well as bail funds, if needed. MACC supports police abolition in lieu of reform.

On September 22, when the cities of New York City, Portland, and Seattle were labelled as anarchist jurisdictions, by United States president Donald Trump. MACC made a statement in which they denounced the use of the word anarchist as a synonym for chaos. MACC later released a statement in solidarity with prison strike in Hudson County Jail, New Jersey. Through January 2020, MACC participated in "mutual aid day", helping distribute food in food banks.

References

Further reading 

 
 
 
 

Anarchism in New York (state)
Organizations based in New York City
Anarchist organizations in the United States
Police abolition movement